Virudhunagar taluk is a taluk of Virudhunagar district of the Indian state of Tamil Nadu. The headquarters of the taluk is the town of Virudhunagar.

Demographics
According to the 2011 census, the taluk of Virudhunagar had a population of 250,782 with 125,329 males and 125,453 females. There were 1,001 women for every 1,000 men. The taluk had a literacy rate of 76.08%. Child population in the age group below 6 years were 11,745 Males and 11,519 Females.

References 

Taluks of Virudhunagar district